Andreas Kjær (31 March 1881 – 5 May 1983) was a Norwegian civil servant and politician. 

Kjær was born in Holum to farmer Peder Kjær and Josefa Kolstad. He was appointed chief administrative officer in Kristiansand from 1923 to 1951, except for the period 1941–1945, during the German occupation of Norway. He was elected representative to the Stortinget for the periods 1931–1933 and 1937–1945, for the Conservative Party. He was decorated Knight, First Class of the Order of the Dannebrog.

References

1881 births
1983 deaths
Year of death missing
People from Vest-Agder
Norwegian civil servants
Norwegian centenarians
Men centenarians
Politicians from Kristiansand
Conservative Party (Norway) politicians
Members of the Storting
Knights First Class of the Order of the Dannebrog